Kerala Revolutionary Socialist Party (Baby John) is a political party in Kerala, India, led by Shibu Baby John (the son of late Baby John, a former Minister in Kerala). RSP (Baby John) is part of the Indian National Congress-led United Democratic Front.

See also
Revolutionary Socialist Party
Revolutionary Socialist Party of Kerala (Bolshevik)
Revolutionary Socialist Party of India (Marxist)

References

Political parties in Kerala
Political parties established in 2005
Political parties disestablished in 2014
2005 establishments in Kerala
2014 disestablishments in India